Benthamina alyxifolia is a species of mistletoe plant, found in Australia.

References

Loranthaceae